"Los Remansos" is a natural spa situated through the river Río Chico de Nono localicated to 3 km of Nono center. Is one of the most famous of tourism places.

Characteristics
The place is formed with the crossing of the stream "El Sanjuanino" to the Rio Chico, with warm water and natural pots. It is a place cited by local newspapers as one of the most recommended to rest.

See also
Nono
Traslasierra

References

External links
 Nono - Balneario Los Remansos

Tourism in Argentina
Tourist attractions in Córdoba Province, Argentina